Auchinleck was one of 32 electoral wards of East Ayrshire Council. Originally created in 1974, the ward was initially within Cumnock and Doon Valley District Council before it was abolished in 1984. Following the local government reforms in the 1990s, the ward was reestablished in 1999 as part of East Ayrshire. The ward elected one councillor using the first-past-the-post voting electoral system.

The ward was a Labour stronghold as the party successfully held the seat at every election.

In 2007, the ward was abolished and replaced by the multi-member Ballochmyle ward as council elections moved to a proportional voting system – the single transferable vote – following the implementation of the Local Governance (Scotland) Act 2004.

Boundaries
The Auchinleck ward was initially created in 1974 by the Formation Electoral Arrangements from the previous Auchinleck North and Auchinleck South electoral divisions excluding the Lugar and Logan polling districts of Ayr County Council. The ward centered around the town of Auchinleck and took in an area in the middle of Cumnock and Doon Valley. Following the Initial Statutory Reviews of Electoral Arrangements in 1981, the ward was abolished and replaced by the Cumnock West and Auchinleck and Catrine, Sorn and North Auchinleck wards. In 1998, the Third Statutory Reviews of Electoral Arrangements reestablished the ward ahead of the 1999 local elections. By this time, local government reforms had taken place and Cumnock and Doon Valley District Council had been merged with Kilmarnock and Loudoun District Council to create East Ayrshire Council. In 2007, the ward was abolished as the Local Governance (Scotland) Act 2004 saw proportional representation and new multi-member wards introduced. The majority of the area covered by the Auchinleck ward was placed into the new Ballochmyle ward and an area south of the town was placed into the Cumnock and New Cumnock ward.

Councillors

Election results

2003 election

1999 election

1980 election

1977 election

1974 election

References

Wards of East Ayrshire
Auchinleck